Roberto Francis Drummond (Ferros, Minas Gerais, December 21, 1933 — Belo Horizonte, June 21, 2002) was a Brazilian journalist and writer.

Works
A morte de DJ em Paris (1971)
O dia em que Ernest Hemingway morreu crucificado (1978)
Sangue de coca-cola (1980)
Quando fui morto em Cuba (1982)
Hitler manda lembranças (1984)
Ontem à noite era sexta-feira (1988)
Hilda Furacão (1991)
Inês é morta (1993)
O homem que subornou a morte & Outras histórias (1993)
Magalhães: navegando contra o vento (1994)
O cheiro de Deus (2001)
Dia de São Nunca à tarde
Os mortos não dançam valsa
O Estripador da Rua G
Uma Paixão em Preto e Branco

References 

1933 births
2002 deaths
Brazilian male writers
Culture in Minas Gerais